This is a list of Mexican states by population density, based on data from the 2020 National Census. Population density is calculated as the ratio of resident population divided by total land area.

References

Population density
Mexico
Mexico, population density